Manj-e Jahrub (also Romanized as Manj-e Jahrūb; also known as Charūb and Monj-e Charūb) is a village in Manj Rural District, Manj District, Lordegan County, Chaharmahal and Bakhtiari Province, Iran. At the 2006 census, its population was 246, in 49 families.

References 

Populated places in Lordegan County